Dino Gabriel  is an Italian-born Anglican bishop of Natal in South Africa. He has a Swazi wife and they have four children. He is a fluent speaker of Zulu.

A former Roman Catholic priest, he came to South Africa as a missionary in 1987. He converted and was ordained an Anglican priest in 1992 in the Diocese of Highveld. He was the dean of the Zululand from 1999 to 2005, and was the bishop of Zululand from 2005 to 2015. He was translated to Natal on 22 November 2015 subsequent to his election on 16 July 2015.

In September 2019, after a tense and acrimonious meeting with the clergy of his diocese Gabriel tendered his resignation as bishop with immediate effect.

References

External links
Diocese of Zululand
ACSA

Living people
21st-century Anglican Church of Southern Africa bishops
Anglican bishops of Natal
Anglican bishops of Zululand
Converts to Anglicanism from Roman Catholicism
Italian Anglicans
Italian emigrants to South Africa
Year of birth missing (living people)